The Monroe County Transit Authority (MCTA), also known as the Pocono Pony, is a public transportation service located in Monroe County, Pennsylvania. It provides rural and inter-city fixed route bus and paratransit service within the county. MCTA is funded in part by PennDOT, the Federal Transit Administration, local match and farebox revenue.

In 2013, East Stroudsburg was designated an Urbanized Zone and became a Metropolitan Statistical Area.  Monroe County Transit Authority is now considered an urban transit system by the Federal Transit Administration.

MCTA had over 318,709 riders in 2012 on both the fixed route bus and paratransit programs.

Fixed Route Service
MCTA provides fixed route service along Monroe County's primary roadways. Service is generally hourly during weekdays, varied on Saturday in East Stroudsburg, Stroudsburg, Stroud Township, Bartonsville, Tannersville, Mt. Pocono and Coolbaugh Township. The Red Route provides service to East Stroudsburg University and Lehigh Valley Hospital-Pocono. The Blue Route has service to Northampton Community College, Monroe Campus, the Pocono Premium Outlets in Tannersville, Mt. Pocono and Coolbaugh Township. There is no service on Sunday.

In 2013, MCTA launched a Live Bus View for patrons to view the actual location of the buses. In November 2013, MCTA will be launching a new fare system that will use state of the art contactless fare cards. The new fare cards will be called "MoGo" as in "Miles to Go." Miles is the official mascot of the Monroe County Transit Authority.

In 2014, the Blue bus was extended to go into the new Northampton Community College campus. As the rural area developed a new resort opened up called Kalahari Resort this caused them to bring at least two new bus route, the silver and purple. The silver bus ran as an extension of a blue bus to Kalahari resort following the Blue bus on Route 196 and on Route 940. The purple was a trial route that ran from Martz Bus Terminal in Mount Pocono all the way to the Pocono Mountain Library in Tobyhanna. Sadly, still no Saturday service for these new routes.

When the bridge construction in Stroudsburg on Bridge came on June 16, 2016, this caused the buses to create a drastic change due to the heavy traffic conditions on the bus routes. The buses but Orange all run on a reduced route and the silver was made a loop, the purple was cancelled due to reduced ridership. Another bus route had also been able to help feed the commuters in the local area called the Stroudsburg Circular to help people travel through the various areas in East Stroudsburg area via Main Street and Watergate Apartments area. As this happens the system is still trying to work out the bus routing and patterns.

MCTA operates the following routes:

The Tobyhanna Express charges premium fare of $2.50

The Monroe County Transit Authority schedule can be found via Google Transit.

Shared Ride Service
Curb to curb paratransit service is available at a discounted cost to eligible populations.  Examples of eligible groups are senior citizens, 65 years or older, persons with disabilities and Medical Assistance Transportation Program participants.

Delaware Water Gap National Recreation Area Transit in the Park
MCTA, with funding from a Transit in the Park pilot grant from DEWA, began providing summer weekend service to areas within the park. In 2013, MCTA is providing free weekend service between Memorial Day Weekend through Labor Day Weekend to Delaware Water Gap borough, Shawnee Inn, Smithfield Beach, Fernwood Resort, Bushkill Boat Launch and Dingmans Boat Launch. This is an external link to the schedule.

References

Bus transportation in Pennsylvania
Paratransit services in the United States
Pocono Mountains
Transportation in Monroe County, Pennsylvania
Government of Monroe County, Pennsylvania